The Kärnten Golf Open was a golf tournament on the Challenge Tour, played in Austria. It was held for the first time in 2009. It was contested over the Pete Dye designed course at the Golf Club Klagenfurt-Seltenheim in Klagenfurt from 2009 to 2012. In 2013 it moved to Jacques Lemans Golf Club in Sankt Georgen am Längsee. In 2014 it moved to the Golfclub Schloss Finkenstein in Gödersdorf.

The tournament was presented by European Tour player, and Austria's top ranked professional golfer at the time, Markus Brier, who also played in the inaugural event to promote golf in the country and his charitable foundation.

Winners

References

External links
Official site
Coverage on the Challenge Tour's official site

Former Challenge Tour events
Golf tournaments in Austria
Recurring sporting events established in 2009
2009 establishments in Austria